Altran UK (formerly known as Altran Praxis, Praxis High Integrity Systems, Praxis Critical Systems, Altran Xype, Xype and Altran Technologies) is a division of parent company Altran. Altran Praxis was a British software house that specialised in critical systems. This role is continued under the banner of high-tech engineering consultancy services provided by the rest of the Altran group.

The division formerly known as Praxis (the critical systems specialists) is based in SouthGate, Bath, England, close to Bath Spa railway station, and also have offices in London, Loughborough, Paris, Sophia Antipolis, and Bangalore.

Altran UK as a whole has offices in Bath, Bristol, London, Loughborough, Manchester, Slough and Coventry.

The company Praxis Systems Limited was founded by Martyn Thomas and David Bean in 1983:
it was incorporated on 1 June 1983 and commenced business on 1 July 1983.
On 28 June 1985 it became a Public limited company Praxis Systems plc.
Until 1988, Praxis was owned almost entirely by its staff.
In 1988 Praxis obtained venture capital finance in order to provide funds for future acquisitions and working capital for continued growth.
On 27 November 1992 Praxis was acquired by Deloitte Consulting (then known as Touche Ross), an international firm of accountants and management consultants.
The critical systems part of the company was acquired by the Altran Group in 1997.
In 2004, Praxis Critical Systems and HIS Consulting merged to form Praxis High Integrity Systems. In January 2010, the company was merged with SC2 by Altran to form Altran Praxis.  The company has since been rebranded to Altran along with Altran Xype and Altran Technologies.
In December 2012, AdaCore along with Altran Praxis released SPARK Pro 11. In 2013, Altran acquired Sentaca, a specialty telecoms consultancy.

A distinguishing feature of the former Praxis office's is its extensive use of formal methods such as the Z notation and the SPARK toolset (acquired through the takeover of the developers Program Validation Limited in 1994) in its approach to improving the reliability of software engineering. A major project using Z has been an enhancement for the United Kingdom's National Air Traffic Services (NATS).

See also 
 Anthony Hall, a former employee, now a consultant
 IPSE (Praxis was a key participant in the influential IPSE2.5 project)

References

External links 
 Company website

Companies established in 1983
1983 establishments in England
Companies based in Bath, Somerset
Software companies of the United Kingdom
Formal methods organizations